Rolands Freimanis (born January 21, 1988) is a Latvian professional basketball player for Trefl Sopot of the Polish Basketball League. He plays at the power forward and center positions.

Professional career
Born in Gulbene, Latvia, Freimanis started his career with ASK Rīga where he played until 2008. For the 2008–09 season he went to BK VEF Rīga. After one season there his contract was bought-out by CB Sevilla as he spent next season playing for their farm-club Qalat Cajasol. Following two years from 2010 till 2012 he played in LEB Gold league with short stint in Spanish ACB League with Lagun Aro GBC.

Before the 2012–13 season, Freimanis joined Sutor Montegranaro of the Lega Basket Serie A. On September 1, 2013, he signed with Ukrainian team Khimik. He had strong season with Khimik that included making Eurocup quarterfinals for the first time in club history as well as reaching Ukrainian League finals. Also, Freimanis showed loyalty to his club as he stayed with team despite difficult political situation in Ukraine.

On August 26, 2014, right after completing summer with Latvian National Team Freimanis joined pre-season training camp of Spanish team Baskonia. On October 30, 2014, Freimanis signed with Estonian champion BC Kalev/Cramo. Freimanis played great basketball for Kalev/Cramo, averaging 18.9 points and 6.4 rebounds in the VTB United League when his contract was bought-out by Russian powerhouse UNICS Kazan. On January 23, 2015, he officially signed with UNICS Kazan. Next season he went back to Estonia, signing with Kalev/Cramo. At the end of the season he became Estonian champion and was named Finals MVP.

Freimanis spent the 2017-18 season with Gaziantep of the Turkish league, averaging 8.1 points and 3.9 rebounds per game. He signed with Ifaistos Limnou of the Greek Basket League on August 10, 2018.

On August 13, 2019, he has signed with Anwil Włocławek of the Polish Basketball League.

On September 28, 2020, Freimanis signed with Stelmet Zielona Góra.

On August 2, 2021, he has signed with Nizhny Novgorod of the VTB United League.

On July 4, 2022, he has signed with Trefl Sopot of the Polish Basketball League.

National team career
He made his Latvian national basketball team debut on June 27, 2007.

On September 4, 2013, he set his career high with Latvia when he scored 24 points in a win over Bosnia and Hercegovina in EuroBasket 2013 opening game.

Awards and accomplishments

Professional career
Kalev/Cramo
Estonian League champion: 2016

Anwil Włocławek
 Polish Cup winner: 2020
 Polish Supercup winner: 2019

Stelmet Zielona Góra
 Polish Cup winner: 2021

Trefl Sopot
 Polish Cup winner: 2023

Individual
KML Finals Most Valuable Player: 2016

References

External links
FIBA Europe Profile
Eurocup Profile

1988 births
Living people
ASK Riga players
Basket Zielona Góra players
BC Kalev/Cramo players
BC Khimik players
BC Nizhny Novgorod players
BC UNICS players
BK VEF Rīga players
CB Girona players
CB Peñas Huesca players
Centers (basketball)
Gaziantep Basketbol players
Gipuzkoa Basket players
Ifaistos Limnou B.C. players
KK Włocławek players
Korvpalli Meistriliiga players
Latvian expatriate basketball people in Estonia
Latvian expatriate basketball people in Spain
Latvian men's basketball players
Liga ACB players
People from Gulbene
Power forwards (basketball)
Sutor Basket Montegranaro players
Trefl Sopot players
Uşak Sportif players